Loadstar may refer to:

 Loadstar (magazine), a disk magazine for the Commodore 64 computer
 Loadstar (duo), a music production duo from Bristol, United Kingdom
 Loadstar: The Legend of Tully Bodine, a game from Rocket Science Games
 International Loadstar, a series of medium and heavy-duty trucks

See also 
 Lodestar (disambiguation)